Terengganu Welcome Sign or Mercu Tanda Selamat Datang ke Negeri Terengganu is a famous landmark in Kuala Terengganu, Terengganu, Malaysia. This landmark is located at the hill of Bukit Besar. Motorists coming into Kuala Terengganu via the Jalan Tengku Mizan see this as their first landmark other than Kuala Terengganu.  The signs read: Allah Peliharakanlah Terengganu (God saves Terengganu).

Buildings and structures in Terengganu
Kuala Terengganu